Regionalne Muzeum Młodej Polski "Rydlówka" is a museum in Kraków, Poland. It was constructed in 1894.

Museums in Kraków
Houses completed in 1894
Historic house museums in Poland